Troitsk (Trojtsä) is a rural locality (a selo) in Kovylkinsky District of the Republic of Mordovia, Russia.

History 
Troitsk was founded in the 17th century as a fortress. During the Stepan Razin rebellion, Troitsk was a rebels' stronghold. From 1780 to 1798 Troitsk was an uyezd center of the Penza Governorate, after which it became a supernumerary town in Krasnoslobodsky Uyezd, ultimatively losing town status in 1925.

Population:  5,822 (1897 Census).

References 

T
Populated places established in 1570
1570 establishments in Europe
Krasnoslobodsky Uyezd
Kovylkinsky District